Kennedia prostrata, commonly known as running postman, scarlet coral pea or scarlet runner, is a species of flowering plant in the family Fabaceae and is endemic to Australia. It is a prostrate or twining shrub with trifoliate leaves and, usually, red flowers.

Description

Taxonomy
Kennedia prostrata was first formally described by Robert Brown in 1812 in Hortus Kewensis. The specific epithet (prostrata) means "prostrate".

Distribution and habitat
Running postman occurs in all Australian states and territories, except Queensland and the Northern Territroy, and grows in a variety of habitats, often on coastal sand dunes and on rock outcrops.

Use in horticulture
The species is naturally adapted to sandy or lighter soils and prefers a sunny position. A widely cultivated species, it grows in temperate to subtropical areas and is hardy in most situations.

References

prostrata
Fabales of Australia
Flora of New South Wales
Flora of Victoria (Australia)
Flora of South Australia
Flora of Tasmania
Rosids of Western Australia
Garden plants
Plants described in 1812
Taxa named by Robert Brown (botanist, born 1773)